Penthetria heteroptera is a species of March fly in the family Bibionidae. It is widespread in the Americas and has been recorded in Europe.

References

External links

 

Bibionidae
Diptera of Europe
Diptera of North America
Diptera of South America
Insects described in 1823
Taxa named by Thomas Say
Articles created by Qbugbot